GFK Osogovo is a football club from Kočani, Republic of Macedonia. They are currently competing in the Macedonian Third League (East Division).

History

The club was founded in 1924, one of the oldest Macedonian football clubs.

In 1973, during a football match between FK Osogovo and FK FAS 11 Oktomvri from Skopje, the 23-year-old Nikola Mantov – one of the best players of FK Osogovo at the time – collapsed on the field and died. In his honor, the home-ground of FK Osogovo is named Nikola Mantov Stadium. The stadium has a capacity of approximately 5,000 spectators.

FK Osogovo has also retired the number 7 shirt in honor of Nikola Mantov.

In the first season of the Macedonian First Football League in 1992–93 Osogovo finished at eighth place; next season they finished at position nine. The highest place in Osogovo history in Macedonian First Football League was in the 1994–95 season, when the team finished at sixth position. Next season (1995–96) they finished at 14th place and were relegated to the Macedonian Second Football League. In the next few years, the team was relegated to the lowest division in Macedonian football (Macedonian Third Football League). From the 2004–05 to 2010–2011 seasons, Osogovo won the Macedonian Third Football League (East) five times, but played only once in the Macedonian Second Football League, in the 2011–12 season. In this season they finished at 14th place and were relegated to Macedonian Third Football League (East). In the last five seasons Osogovo appeared in the Macedonian Third Football League (East) without any success. But in season 2016-17 FK Osogovo finished at 3rd place and promoted to Macedonian Second Football league(East).

Supporters

Sejmeni are an Ultras group founded in 1991, who support FK Osogovo and traditionally occupy the West Stand at the stadium. Also Sejmeni consumes a lot of pyrotechnics.

Honours
'' Macedonian Third League:
Winners (1): 2018–19
 Macedonian Second League:
Winners (1): 1997–98
Runners-up (1): 1996–97
 Macedonian Football Cup Youth:
Winners (1): 1996

Recent seasons

1The 2019–20 season was abandoned due to the COVID-19 pandemic in North Macedonia.

Current squad
As of 17 October 2022.

}

Club officials

Technical staff

Board members

References

External links
Official Website 

FK Osogovo Blog 
Club info at MacedonianFootball 
Football Federation of Macedonia 

 
Football clubs in North Macedonia
Association football clubs established in 1924
1924 establishments in Yugoslavia
FK